Robert Perfect (1790 – 29 July 1875) was a British Whig politician.

Perfect was elected a Whig Member of Parliament for Lewes at a by-election in 1847—caused by the resignation of Sir Howard Elphinstone, 2nd Baronet—and held the seat until 1852 when he did not seek re-election.

References

External links
 

UK MPs 1841–1847
UK MPs 1847–1852
Whig (British political party) MPs for English constituencies
1790 births
1875 deaths